The 1985 Nicholls State Colonels football team represented Nicholls State University as a member of the Gulf Star Conference during the 1985 NCAA Division I-AA football season. Led by fifth-year head coach Sonny Jackson, the Colonels compiled an overall record of 6–5 with a mark of 2–3 in conference play, placing in a three-way tie for third in the Gulf State. Nicholls State played home games at John L. Guidry Stadium in Thibodaux, Louisiana.

Schedule

References

Nicholls State
Nicholls Colonels football seasons
Nicholls State Colonels football